Byåsen Toppfotball is a Norwegian football club based in Trondheim and a section of the multi-sport organization Byåsen IL. Byåsen are currently playing in the 3. divisjon, the fourth tier of the Norwegian football league system, having last played in the 2. divisjon in 2019.

History
Byåsen was promoted to the 1. divisjon in 1995, and with Jan Halvor Halvorsen as coach they were positioned in the top of the second tier in the late 1990s. The closest Byåsen came to win promotion to the top division was in 1998 when they started the season with seven league-victories in a row and a goaldifference of 19-4. Unfortunately for Byåsen, they finished the season with three losses in a row and was one point behind third-placed Kjelsås, which played promotion play-off against Kongsvinger.

In 1999, Byåsen was docked three points by NFF due to economic difficulties, and during the next two seasons the struggle continued until they were relegated to the 2. divisjon in 2001, where they are still playing.

Recent history
{|class="wikitable"
|-bgcolor="#efefef"
! Season
! 
! Pos.
! Pl.
! W
! D
! L
! GS
! GA
! P
!Cup
!Notes
|-
|2002
|2. divisjon
|align=right |4
|align=right|26||align=right|17||align=right|5||align=right|4
|align=right|79||align=right|44||align=right|56
|Third round
|
|-
|2003
|2. divisjon
|align=right |4
|align=right|26||align=right|15||align=right|1||align=right|10
|align=right|54||align=right|45||align=right|46
|Third round
|
|-
|2004
|2. divisjon
|align=right |5
|align=right|26||align=right|12||align=right|4||align=right|10
|align=right|48||align=right|45||align=right|40
|Second round
|
|-
|2005
|2. divisjon
|align=right |7
|align=right|26||align=right|13||align=right|3||align=right|10
|align=right|69||align=right|44||align=right|42
|Third round
|
|-
|2006
|2. divisjon
|align=right |6
|align=right|26||align=right|12||align=right|2||align=right|12
|align=right|65||align=right|48||align=right|38
|Second round
|
|-
|2007
|2. divisjon
|align=right |8
|align=right|26||align=right|10||align=right|5||align=right|11
|align=right|47||align=right|41||align=right|35
|Second round
|
|-
|2008
|2. divisjon
|align=right |7
|align=right|26||align=right|11||align=right|5||align=right|10
|align=right|55||align=right|51||align=right|38
|First round
|
|-
|2009
|2. divisjon
|align=right |6
|align=right|26||align=right|11||align=right|7||align=right|8
|align=right|52||align=right|38||align=right|40
|Second round
|
|-
|2010
|2. divisjon
|align=right |11
|align=right|26||align=right|8||align=right|7||align=right|11
|align=right|40||align=right|60||align=right|27
|Second round
|
|-
|2011
|2. divisjon
|align=right |3
|align=right|26||align=right|12||align=right|8||align=right|6
|align=right|65||align=right|48||align=right|44
|Third round
|
|-
|2012 
|2. divisjon
|align=right |4
|align=right|26||align=right|14||align=right|5||align=right|7
|align=right|57||align=right|47||align=right|47
|Third round
|
|-
|2013
|2. divisjon
|align=right |5
|align=right|26||align=right|12||align=right|4||align=right|10
|align=right|52||align=right|44||align=right|40
|Second round
|
|-
|2014
|2. divisjon
|align=right |2
|align=right|26||align=right|16||align=right|5||align=right|5
|align=right|64||align=right|40||align=right|53
|Second round
|
|-
|2015
|2. divisjon
|align=right |5
|align=right|26||align=right|12||align=right|4||align=right|10
|align=right|35||align=right|42||align=right|40
|Second round
|
|-
|2016
|2. divisjon
|align=right |6
|align=right|26||align=right|12||align=right|4||align=right|10
|align=right|44||align=right|49||align=right|40
|Second round
|
|-
|2017 
|2. divisjon
|align=right bgcolor="#FFCCCC"| 14
|align=right|26||align=right|3||align=right|4||align=right|19
|align=right|22||align=right|52||align=right|13
|Second round
|Relegated to the 3. divisjon
|-
|2018 
|3. divisjon
|align=right bgcolor="#DDFFDD"| 1
|align=right|26||align=right|18||align=right|4||align=right|4
|align=right|66||align=right|25||align=right|58
|First round
|Promoted to the 2. divisjon
|-
|2019 
|2. divisjon
|align=right bgcolor="#FFCCCC"| 14
|align=right|26||align=right|4||align=right|5||align=right|17
|align=right|28||align=right|63||align=right|17
|First round
|Relegated to the 3. divisjon
|-
|2020
|colspan="11"|Season cancelled
|-
|2021
|3. divisjon
|align=right |6
|align=right|13||align=right|5||align=right|4||align=right|4
|align=right|23||align=right|20||align=right|19
|First round
|
|-
|2022
|3. divisjon
|align=right |2
|align=right|26||align=right|19||align=right|2||align=right|5
|align=right|84||align=right|25||align=right|59
|Third round
|
|}
Source:

References

External links
Official Site: www.byåsenfotball.no

Football clubs in Norway
Association football clubs established in 1921
Sport in Trondheim
1921 establishments in Norway